Heterogymna is a genus of moths in the Carposinidae family.

Species
Heterogymna anterastes Diakonoff, 1954
Heterogymna cheesmanae Bradley, 1962
Heterogymna chorospila Meyrick, 1922
Heterogymna collegialis Meyrick, 1925
Heterogymna comitialis Meyrick, 1925
Heterogymna globula Diakonoff, 1973
Heterogymna gyritis Meyrick, 1910
Heterogymna heptanoma Meyrick, 1925
Heterogymna melanococca Diakonoff, 1954
Heterogymna melanocrypta Diakonoff, 1967
Heterogymna metarsia Diakonoff, 1989
Heterogymna ochrogramma Meyrick, 1913
=Heterogymna coloba Diakonoff, 1989
=Heterogymna seriatopunctata Matsumura, 1931 (originally in Psecadia)
=Heterogymna toxotes Diakonoff, 1989
Heterogymna pardalota Meyrick, 1922
Heterogymna parthenia Diakonoff, 1954
Heterogymna polystigma Diakonoff, 1954
Heterogymna stenygra Diakonoff, 1954
Heterogymna xenochroma Diakonoff, 1954
Heterogymna zacentra Meyrick, 1913

References

Natural History Museum Lepidoptera generic names catalog

Carposinidae
Moth genera